Shirin Bolagh, also rendered as Shirinbolaq, may refer to various places in Iran:

Shirin Bolagh, Ardabil
Shirin Bolagh, East Azerbaijan
Shirin Bolagh, Bostanabad, East Azerbaijan Province
Shirin Bolagh, Kurdistan
Shirin Bolagh, Markazi
Shirin Bolagh, Chaypareh, West Azerbaijan Province
Shirin Bolagh, Naqadeh, West Azerbaijan Province

See also
Şirinbulaq, Azerbaijan